Protogoniomorpha is a genus of nymphalid butterflies found in the Afrotropical realm, commonly known as mother-of-pearls.

Taxonomy
Protogoniomorpha was viewed as part of Salamis by Ackery et al. (1995). Based on phylogenetic research, the group was reinstated as distinct genus, with some members possibly needing further reassignment.

Species
 Protogoniomorpha anacardii (Linnaeus, 1758) — clouded mother-of-pearl
 Protogoniomorpha cytora (Doubleday, 1847) — western blue beauty
 Protogoniomorpha duprei Vinson, 1863 — Madagascan mother-of-pearl (sometimes listed as a subspecies of P. anacardii)
 Protogoniomorpha parhassus (Druce, 1782) — common mother-of-pearl or forest mother-of-pearl
 Protogoniomorpha temora Felder, 1867 — blue mother-of-pearl

References 

 
Seitz, A. Die Gross-Schmetterlinge der Erde 13: Die Afrikanischen Tagfalter. Plate XIII 50

Junoniini
Butterfly genera
Taxa named by Hans Daniel Johan Wallengren